The 2016–17 South Carolina State Bulldogs basketball team represented South Carolina State University during the 2016–17 NCAA Division I men's basketball season. The Bulldogs, led by fourth-year head coach Murray Garvin, played their home games at the SHM Memorial Center as members of the Mid-Eastern Athletic Conference. They finished the season 11–20, 7–9 in MEAC play to finish in a three-way tie for seventh place. They defeated Florida A&M in the MEAC tournament before losing in the quarterfinals to Norfolk State.

Previous season
The Bulldogs finished the 2015–16 season 19–15, 12–4 in MEAC play to finish in a tie for second place. They defeated Coppin State and Norfolk State to advance to the championship game of the MEAC tournament where they lost to Hampton. They were invited to the CollegeInsider.com Tournament where they lost in the first round to Grand Canyon.

Preseason 
The Bulldogs were picked to finish in second place in the preseason MEAC poll. Eric Eaves was named to the preseason All-MEAC first team and Edward Stephens was named to the second team.

Roster

Schedule and results

|-
!colspan=9 style="background:#; color:white;"| Non-conference regular season

|-
!colspan=9 style="background:#; color:white;"| MEAC regular season

|-
!colspan=9 style="background:#; color:white;"|MEAC tournament

References

South Carolina State Bulldogs basketball seasons
South Carolina State